Frodo may mean:


Given name or nickname
Frodo Baggins, a character in The Lord of the Rings by J.R.R. Tolkien
Fróði, the name of a number of Danish kings, Latinized as Frodo
Frodo (chimpanzee) 
Frodo, nickname of Magomedrasul Khasbulaev, Russian mixed martial artist

Software
Frodo, a Commodore 64 emulator
Frodo, a bare-bones version of the Slax Linux distribution
FRODO (Federated Repositories of Online Digital Objects) projects, part of the Australian government's Systemic Infrastructure Initiative
Frodo, codename of the XBMC Media Center software version 12

Other uses
"Frodo", a song by New Zealand folk-duo Flight of the Conchords

See also
Captain Frodo (born 1976), Norwegian contortionist

ru:Фродо (имя)